Albert Paul Moïse Weil (26 December 1880 – 5 December 1945) was a French sailor. He was won the Silver medal helming his boat Rose Pompon along with its crew Robert Monier and Félix Picon in Sailing at the 1920 Summer Olympics – 6.5 Metre race.

References

External links
 
 

1880 births
1945 deaths
French male sailors (sport)
Olympic sailors of France
Olympic medalists in sailing
Olympic silver medalists for France
Sailors at the 1920 Summer Olympics – 6.5 Metre
Medalists at the 1920 Summer Olympics
Sportspeople from Paris